Charlie Ward  (born 17 December 1980) is an Irish mixed martial artist currently competing in the middleweight division of Bellator MMA. A professional competitor since 2014, he formerly competed for the UFC.

Mixed martial arts career

Early career
Ward held an amateur record of 2–0 before beginning his professional MMA career in 2015, competing for regional promotions in the United Kingdom and Ireland. He lost his debut where he was stopped in round two by John Phillips. He rebounded with three straight victories, winning over Ciaran Daly, João Carvalho and Gareth Williams.

Ultimate Fighting Championship
Ward was signed by the UFC in 2016. with the record of 3–1.

Ward was expected to make his promotional debut against Randy Brown on 9 December 2016 at UFC Fight Night 102. However, Ward was pulled from that fight in early November due to alleged visa issues which restricted his travel to the United States and was replaced by fellow newcomer Brian Camozzi. In turn, he was quickly rescheduled to face Abdul Razak Alhassan on 19 November 2016 at UFC Fight Night: Mousasi vs. Hall 2. Ward suffered a quick defeat where he was finished via knockout in the fight's opening minute.

Ward faced Galore Bofando at UFC Fight Night: Nelson vs. Ponzinibbio on 16 July 2017. He lost the fight via knockout after Bofando slammed him to the mat with a hip toss early in the first round. He was subsequently released from the promotion.

Bellator MMA
Ward made the move to join Bellator MMA and made his debut on 10 November 2017 at Bellator 187 in Dublin against John Redmond. Ward knocked out Redmond at the end of round one, however referee Marc Goddard needed to verify that the knock out was before the buzzer. Conor McGregor, Ward's teammate, jumped the cage to celebrate with Ward before the fight was officially declared over. McGregor was separated Goddard, who in turn charged towards Goddard and pushed and confronted Goddard in a wild melee which caused an official to bump into Redmond as he was getting up.

McGregor did a lap of the cage and exited a few minutes later but then scaled and straddled the cage apron to continue the celebration of Ward's winning. He was stopped by a commissioner and McGregor was agitated and slapped the commissioner's face as McGregor admitted saying "Did you see your man trying to grab me and I gave him a clatter in the face" Redmond stated after the fight that Goddard had intended to continue to fight to round two but Mohegan Sun commission who oversaw the event decided to end the fight and declared the win to Ward due to McGregor's behaviour in the ring.

For his second fight with the promotion, Ward faced Martin Hudson at Bellator 200 held in the Wembley Arena on 25 May 2018. He won the fight via TKO in the first round.

Ward faced Justin Moore at Bellator 223 on 22 June 2019. He won the fight via technical knockout in the second round.

On 15 August 2019, it was announced that Ward had signed an exclusive multi-fight, multi-year contract extension with Bellator. Ward was expected to face Pietro Penini at Bellator Dublin on 27 September 2019, but the bout was scrapped due to Ward's injury. Subsequently, the bout was rescheduled to Bellator London 2 on 23 November 2019. Ward lost the fight via unanimous decision.

Next, Ward faced Kyle Kurtz at Bellator 240 on 22 February 2020. Ward rebounded from the loss via third-round knockout.

Ward faced Andy Manzolo at Bellator Milan 3 on 3 October 2020. He won the fight via unanimous decision.

Ward was scheduled to face Norbert Novenyi Jr. at Bellator 270 on November 5, 2021. On October 6, Norbert announced that he had suffered a torn ACL and had to pull out of the bout and was replaced by Fabian Edwards. Ward had to pull out however due to a ruptured bicep.

Ward faced Alan Carlos at Bellator 281 on May 13, 2022. He won the bout via unanimous decision.

Ward faced Fabian Edwards on October 29, 2022 at Bellator 287. He lost the bout via unanimous decision.

Ward faced Mike Shipman on February 25, 2023 at Bellator 291. He lost the bout via unanimous decision.

Death of João Carvalho
Ward's victory over João Carvalho by knockout at Total Extreme Fighting 1 on 9 April 2016 was overcast with a tragic circumstance.  Carvalho felt unwell, suffering from a headache 20 minutes after the fight and was sent to a hospital for a brain surgery. He died at Beaumont Hospital in Dublin 48 hours later as a result of injuries he suffered in the defeat. His death sparked outpouring grief from the MMA community.

The death of Carvalho aroused considerable debate, focusing on the sentiment that the fight should have been stopped much earlier. The referee who was in charge of the fight, Mariusz Domasat, defended his decision and said "If you watch the fight you see clearly there was no reason to stop the fight earlier. I stopped the fight when there was a reason to stop the fight, when the fighter wasn't willing to fight anymore, that's it. Everyone who has any idea about MMA knows the fight was stopped at the exact proper time. I am an experienced referee and part of the Irish Amateur Pankration Association of Safe MMA and I know what I am doing." Subsequently, Minister for Travel, Tourism and Sport Michael Ring, reiterated his long concern of the safety aspect of the sport which he had written to 17 MMA promoters in Ireland where he expected MMA should adhere to the safety standards as applied in other sports.

Mixed martial arts record

|-
|Loss
|align=center|10–6
|Mike Shipman
|Decision (unanimous)
|Bellator 291
|
|align=center|3
|align=center|5:00
|Dublin, Ireland
|
|-
|Loss
|align=center|10–5
|Fabian Edwards
|Decision (unanimous)
|Bellator 287
|
|align=center|3
|align=center|5:00
|Milan, Italy
|
|-
|Win
|align=center|10–4
|Alan Carlos
|Decision (unanimous)
|Bellator 281
|
|align=center|3
|align=center|5:00
|London, England
|
|-
|Win
|align=center|9–4
|Andy Manzolo	
|Decision (unanimous)
|Bellator Milan 3 
|
|align=center|3
|align=center|5:00
|Milan, Italy
|
|-
|Win
|align=center|8–4
|Kyle Kurtz
|TKO (punches)
|Bellator 240
|
|align=center|3
|align=center|4:24
|Dublin, Ireland
|
|-
|Loss
|align=center|7–4
|Pietro Penini Jr.
|Decision (unanimous)
|Bellator London 2 
|
|align=center|3
|align=center|5:00
|London, England
|
|-
|Win
|align=center|7–3
|Justin Moore
|TKO (punches)
|Bellator 223
|
|align=center|2
|align=center|3:23
|London, England
|
|-
|Win
|align=center|6–3
|Jamie Stephenson
|KO (punch)
|Bellator 217
|
|align=center|1
|align=center|0:34
|Dublin, Ireland
|
|-
|Win
|align=center|5–3
|Martin Hudson
|TKO (punches)
|Bellator 200 
|
|align=center|1
|align=center|2:23
|London, England
|
|-
|Win
|align=center|4–3
|John Redmond
|KO (punch)
|Bellator 187 
|
|align=center|1
|align=center|4:59
|Dublin, Ireland
|Return to Middleweight.
|-
|Loss
|align=center|3–3
|Galore Bofando
|KO (slam and punches)
|UFC Fight Night: Nelson vs. Ponzinibbio 
|
|align=center|1
|align=center|2:10
|Glasgow, Scotland
|
|-
| Loss
| align=center| 3–2
| Abdul Razak Alhassan
| KO (punches)
| UFC Fight Night: Mousasi vs. Hall 2
| 
| align=center| 1
| align=center| 0:53
| Belfast, Northern Ireland
|
|-
| Win
| align=center| 3–1
| Gareth Williams
| Decision (majority)
| Adrenalin Fight Nights: Adrenalin Blast
| 
| align=center| 3
| align=center| 5:00
| Swansea, Wales
|
|-
| Win
| align=center| 2–1
| João Carvalho
| TKO (punches)
| Total Extreme Fighting 1
| 
| align=center| 3
| align=center| N/A
| Dublin, Ireland
|
|-
| Win
| align=center| 1–1
| Ciaran Daly
| Decision (unanimous)
| Cage Kings 2
| 
| align=center| 3
| align=center| 5:00
| Dublin, Ireland
|
|-
| Loss
| align=center| 0–1
| John Phillips
| KO (punch)
| Fightstar Promotions: Rage in the Cage 3
| 
| align=center| 2
| align=center| 0:00
| Paisley, Scotland
|
|-

See also
 List of Irish UFC fighters
 List of male mixed martial artists

References

External links
 
 

Living people
Welterweight mixed martial artists
Irish male mixed martial artists
People from County Laois
Sportspeople from County Laois
Ultimate Fighting Championship male fighters
1980 births